Ahmed Adams (born 6 March 1993) is a Ghanaian footballer who plays as defender for Iceland club KFA in  2.deild.

Career

Club career
Adams has played for his club Berekum Chelsea in the Ghana Premier League.

International career
In 2013, coach Sellas Tetteh called him up to be a member of the Ghana Under 20 national team for the 2013 African Youth Championship in Algeria. He played one match during the tournament.

Personal life
He is the elder brother of TSG Hoffenheim and Black Stars defender Kasim Nuhu Adams.

References 

1993 births
Living people
Association football defenders
Ghanaian footballers
Ghana international footballers
2013 African U-20 Championship players
Competitors at the 2011 All-Africa Games
African Games gold medalists for Ghana
African Games medalists in football
Al-Shoulla FC players
Saudi Professional League players
2. deild karla players
Ghanaian expatriate footballers
Expatriate footballers in Saudi Arabia
Ghanaian expatriate sportspeople in Saudi Arabia
Expatriate footballers in Iceland